Michael Roland Steele-Bodger CBE (4 September 1925 – 9 May 2019) was an English rugby union footballer who played flanker for Harlequins,  and Barbarians, and was President of the Barbarian Football Club and President of the East India Club, London.

He was educated at Rugby School and Gonville and Caius College, Cambridge, and played for Cambridge in the Varsity Match in 1945 and 1946. On graduation he studied at Edinburgh University and represented the Edinburgh University rugby club for two full seasons.  Steele-Bodger followed his father Harry by becoming a Veterinary Surgeon, as did his elder brother Alasdair who also played for Edinburgh University.

He gained 9 caps for England, playing in all 4 matches in the 1946-47 season and all 5 matches in the 1947-48 season. In his final international, against  in March 1948, Steele-Bodger had to move to scrum-half when Richard Madge left the field, despite suffering from concussion himself. An anterior cruciate ligament injury ended his playing career in 1949. Subsequently, he was a selector for England and The Lions, President of the Rugby Football Union in 1973-74, and Chairman of the International Rugby Board.

In 1948, he inaugurated the annual tradition of bringing a guest Steele-Bodger XV to play Cambridge University as a warm-up to the Varsity Match.

He was an active member of the Round Table being one of the founding members of his local Tamworth Round Table in 1952.

He was appointed Commander of the Order of the British Empire in the 1990 New Year Honours "for services to Rugby Union Football."

Steele-Bodger died on 9 May 2019, aged 93.

References

External links 
 http://www.scrum.com/england/rugby/player/4912.html
 http://www.rugbynetwork.net/main/s98/st113904.htm

1925 births
2019 deaths
Harlequin F.C. players
Barbarian F.C. players
English rugby union players
Rugby union flankers
England international rugby union players
English rugby union administrators
Cambridge University R.U.F.C. players
Edinburgh University RFC players
People educated at Rugby School
Alumni of Gonville and Caius College, Cambridge
Alumni of the University of Edinburgh
Sportspeople from Tamworth, Staffordshire
Commanders of the Order of the British Empire
English veterinarians
British veterinarians
Rugby union players from Staffordshire